Courtney George (born June 24, 1986) is an American curler from Duluth, Minnesota.

Career
George began curling in 1998. She won two medals at the World Junior Curling Championships as alternate for Cassandra Johnson, gold in 2002 and silver in 2003. She was also a national junior champion in 2004 and 2007.

George participated in the 2005 United States Olympic Curling Trials, playing as third for skip Aileen Sormunen, and qualified for the playoffs in fourth place, but lost their page playoffs game against Patti Lank. George was asked to serve as the alternate for the United States women's team skipped by Cassandra Johnson. Throughout the competition when it was clear the United States would not win their matches Courtney George was regularly brought in to play an end which alternates typically do not get to do at major competitions.

George played as the vice-skip on the team skipped by Amy Wright, finishing third at the 2010 United States Olympic Curling Trials.

George played as third for Sormunen at the 2011 and 2012 United States Women's Curling Championships, finishing sixth and fourth, respectively. George and Sormunen switched positions the next year, and finished second at the 2013 United States Women's Curling Championship. George and her team were selected to participate at the 2014 United States Olympic Curling Trials by the national High Performance Program committee.

Personal life
George has a degree in the psychology of behavioral science from the University of St. Thomas. She is currently a personal care assistant, and is finishing a master's degree in occupational therapy.

George's brother Tyler is also a successful curler, winning the gold medal at the 2018 Winter Olympics.

Teams

Women's

Mixed

Mixed doubles

References

External links
 
Courtney George on the United States Curling Association database

1986 births
Living people
Olympic curlers of the United States
Sportspeople from Duluth, Minnesota
Curlers at the 2006 Winter Olympics
University of St. Thomas (Minnesota) alumni
American female curlers
21st-century American women